The lists shown below shows the Philippines national football team records in competitive and non-competitive tournaments, as well as individual and team records, and their head-to-head record against all opponents.

Individual records

Player records

Players in bold are still active.

Most capped players

Top goalscorers

Manager records

Team records

Competition  records

FIFA World Cup
The Philippines has never qualified for the FIFA World Cup. The national team entered the 1950 FIFA World Cup qualification but withdrew without playing a single game. The Philippines had intended to enter the 1962 edition but did not push through with the plan. The country's entry to the 1966 edition was not accepted due to its association not being able to pay the registration fee for the qualifiers and the national team withdrew from the 1974 FIFA World Cup qualification just as they did in the 1950 qualifiers. The national team made its first participation in a FIFA World Cup qualifiers for the 1998 edition.

At the 2002 FIFA World Cup qualifiers, Yanti Barsales made the first goal for the Philippines at a FIFA World Cup qualifier against Syria.

The national team did not enter the qualifiers for the next succeeding editions until the 2014 FIFA World Cup qualifiers, about 10 years later. The national team secured their first victory in a World Cup qualifier against Sri Lanka, 4–0.

Olympic Games
The senior national team never managed to qualify for the Olympics.

 Since 1992, the Olympic team has been drawn from a squad with a maximum of three players over 23 years of age, and the achievements of this team are not generally regarded as part of the national team's records, nor are the statistics credited to the players' international records.

AFC Asian Cup

The Philippines qualified once for the Asian Cup, in 2019. For the 2011 and the 2015 AFC Asian Cup, the Philippines attempted to qualify for the tournament through the AFC Challenge Cup. The Philippines would have been invited to host the 1968 Asian Cup, a tournament in which it did not qualify for, if Iran withdrew as hosts.

 After the inception of the AFC Challenge Cup, new changes in AFC Competition rules were made.  Countries categorized as "emerging nations" which include the Philippines, do not enter Asian Cup qualification starting with the 2011 edition.  Therefore, failure to qualify and failure to win the Challenge Cup automatically results in failure to qualify for the Asian Cup.

Asian Games
The senior national team made its best finish at the 1958 Asian Games where it reached the Quarterfinals of the tournament. The Philippines also has hosted the 1954 edition.

 Only until the 1998 edition is listed; football at the Asian Games changed to an under-23 tournament since the 2002 edition.

AFC Challenge Cup
The AFC Challenge Cup was organized as a route for nations classified as "emerging" or "developing" as a sole route to qualify for the Asian Cup. The Philippines is among these nations
and participated at the inaugural 2006 AFC Challenge Cup. After a qualification phase was introduced the Philippines failed to qualify for the next two succeeding editions in 2008 and 2010. The Philippines qualified for the 2012 AFC Challenge Cup where the finished third. Phil Younghusband was the Golden Boot winner of the edition scoring six goals in the final tournament. The team reached the finals of 2014 edition of the tournament settling for second place after losing to Palestine in the finals. The AFC Challenge Cup tournament was dissolved after the 2014 edition.

Far Eastern Games
Out of the ten football tournaments held in ten editions of the Far Eastern Games, The Philippines only won the inaugural 1913 edition despite fielding American, Spanish and British players violating tournament rules in that edition. The team was nevertheless named champions. China was awarded champions of the nine other editions of the tournaments. At the 1917 Far Eastern Games, the Philippines recorded its biggest victory in an international match to date, which was the 15–2 win against Japan. FC Barcelona player, Paulino Alcántara was part of the national squad.

AFF Championship
The Philippines participated in every edition of the AFF Championship except the 2008 edition in which the team failed to qualify for the final tournament. Their first match in the tournament was a 0–5 defeat handed by Thailand in 1996 edition. Freddy Gonzalez scored the first goal for the Philippines in the tournament in a 1–3 defeat, also to Thailand in the 1998 edition. Emelio Caligdong made a brace in the national team's 2–1 victory against Timor Leste in the 2004 edition. The victory was the first for the Philippines in the AFF Championship.

The national team fared poorly during the first seven editions of the AFF Championship from 1996 to 2008 losing 19 out of 21 matches. The Philippines' worst defeat at the tournament was the 1–13 match against Indonesia at the 2002 AFF Championship which was also remains the highest scoreline in the tournament as of 2014. The national team made to its first semi-finals at the 2010 AFF Championship.

Southeast Asian Games
The senior national team managed to reach the semi-finals of the football tournament of the Southeast Asian Games before the football was made into an under-23 tournament.

 Only until the 1999 edition is listed; football at the SEA Games changed to an under-23 tournament since the 2001 edition.
 The 1959–1975 editions are not listed as the Philippines were not yet members of the SEAP Federation.

Minor tournaments
The Philippines participated at numerous minor friendly tournaments. Aside from other national teams, the Philippine nationals also faced selection teams and club sides from other nations at some of these tournaments. The team made a podium finish, placing not below third place, at the Japanese Empire-sanctioned East Asian Games in 1940, the Long Teng Cup (2010, 2011) held in Taiwan, and all three editions of the Philippine Peace Cup (2012, 2013 and 2014) hosted by the home country.

Head-to-head record
Last match updated was against  on 2 January 2023

References

External links
 FIFA.com

 
National association football team records and statistics